Steve Hamilton may refer to:
Steve Hamilton (sportsman, born 1934) (1934–1997), American professional baseball and basketball player
Steve Hamilton (author) (born 1961), American detective novel writer
Steve Hamilton (American football) (born 1961), American defensive end for the Washington Redskins
Steve Hamilton (broadcaster) (born Roland James Hamillton, 1950–2009), Scottish broadcaster who voiced the UK version of Wheel of Fortune
Steve Hamilton, Scottish jazz pianist associated with Earthworks (band)

See also
Steven Hamilton (born 1970), Australian AFL footballer for North Melbourne
Steven Hamilton (footballer) (born 1975), Scottish footballer for Kilmarnock, Raith Rovers, Stenhousemuir